Washington Cemetery is a historical and predominantly Jewish burial ground located at 5400 Bay Parkway in Mapleton, Brooklyn, New York, United States.

Founded in Kings County in 1850, outside the independent city of Brooklyn, it became a Jewish burial ground as early as 1857, at first serving primarily German Jewish immigrants. Brooklyn's cemeteries were authorized under the Rural Cemetery Act of 1847, which allowed for the construction of commercial cemeteries outside what were then city limits. This part of Kings County was not yet incorporated into the City of Brooklyn, and the legislation resulted in the development of several large parcels of farmland as cemeteries. Later in the 19th and early 20th centuries, most Jewish immigrants came from the Russian Empire and Eastern Europe.

Cemetery configuration
Washington Cemetery is made up of five "gated cemeteries," separated by several local Brooklyn streets. The cemetery office building is located on the grounds of Cemetery #1, which was the original cemetery. It is served by the Bay Parkway station of the F train of the New York City Subway.

The founder of Washington Cemetery, James Arlington Bennet, is buried there, as are his wife and son. Bennet was born in New York, and was proprietor and principal of the Arlington House, an educational institution on Long Island. He is usually remembered as Joseph Smith's first choice as Vice-Presidential running mate in the United States presidential election of 1844, before Smith was assassinated. His surname is misspelled on his headstone, which reads, "Author of Bennett's Book Keeping & Other Works. Founder of Washington Cemetery."

Cemetery #1
Cemetery #1 is shaped like a pentagon, and bordered on three of its sides by major Brooklyn streets: Ocean Parkway, Bay Parkway, and McDonald Avenue. The main entrance and cemetery office building are on Bay Parkway just off McDonald Avenue. The interior of Cemetery #1 is crisscrossed by paths called Rose, Hyacinth, Jasmine, Aster, Lotus, and Evergreen avenues. It has numerical posts from number one to number one hundred and forty-nine "A" (1–149A), sections marked "ranges". It has "burial society" sections established by early immigrant groups of landsmannschaft or synagogue congregations. Burials are still being conducted here. This section houses the majority of the mausoleums and larger monuments. In December 2010, this section sustained the majority of some 200 overturned and broken headstones damaged by vandals at the cemetery. Although there are concrete walkways through the area, grave markers are very closely positioned in some areas, and visitors sometimes have to walk on grass.

Cemetery #2
Cemetery #2 is located across from Cemetery #1 and the office building. It is triangular, bounded on two of its sides by major thoroughfares: McDonald Avenue on the northeast and Bay Parkway on the northwest; it has four entrances and exits. Cemetery posts are numbered 150 to 237. It is crisscrossed by paths, and houses burial or congregational society sections. Its named paths are Cedar, Maple, and Cypress avenues.

Cemetery #3
Cemetery #3 is located across Bay Parkway directly across from Cemetery #2. It is bounded by Bay Parkway on its southeast and 21st Avenue on its northwest. It has five entrances and exits, and numbered posts from 231 to 333. Its named paths are Orange, Sycamore, Spruce, Aspen, and Balsam avenues.

Cemetery #4
Cemetery #4 is directly across 21st Avenue from Cemetery #3, bounded by 21st Avenue on its southeast and 20th Avenue on its northwest, and has numbered posts are 334 to 462. It has five entrances and exits, and paths named are Walnut, Ash, Tulip, Iris, and Pine avenues.

Cemetery #5
Cemetery #5 is directly across Cemetery #4, and bounded by 20th Avenue on its southeast. Its numbered posts run from 464 to 519. Oak, Magnolia, Arcadia, and Birch avenues are its named paths. It has sections with four numbers on its west side.

List of Societies in Washington cemeteries
(partial list)
 Adler's Young Men Independent Association – Cemetery #1, Post 60
 Agudas Achim Anshe Wilner (also Congregation Machsika Torah Ansha Seinier) – established in 1874
 Agudas Achim Anshe Wilner (also Congregation Machsike Torah Anshe Wilno) – established in 1899
 Beth Israel Congregation – Cemetery #1, Post 62
 Bielsker Bruderlicher Unterstitzungs Verein – Cemetery #2, Post 222
 Bialystoker Somach Noflim
 Bnei Isaac Anshei Lechowitz (Lyakhovichi)
 Bnai Mosche Anshe Ullanover & Umgagend
 Chebra Rofei Cholim M. Krakau – Cemetery #1, Post 102 (Cemetery Records & Photo of Gate)
 Chevra Adas Wolkowisk – Cemetery #2, Post 158 and Cemetery #4, Post 371
 Chevra Anshe Chesed B'nai Kowna – Cemetery #1, Post 81
 Chevra Bikur Cholem Anshei Zuromin – Cemetery #4, Post 363
 Chevra Nor Tomid Anshi Lebashoff – Cemetery Section #3 Post 300
 Chevra Machzikei Hadas Anshei Sfard – Cemetery #3, Post 295
 Chevra Rodfei Zedek Anshe Ritava – Cemetery #1, Post 14
 Chevra Shaare Benah – Cemetery #1, Post 83
 Congregation Agudath Achim M'Krakauer, Organized in 1867 – Cemetery #1, Post 104
 Congregation Bnei Israel Anshe Keidan – Cemetery #1, Post 144, and Cemetery #3, Post 287
 Congregation Tifferith Israel of Brooklyn – Cemetery #5, Post 517
 Dobromiler Sick & Benevolent Society, Cemetery #2
 Erster Dobromiler Kranken Unt. Verein – Cemetery #2, Post 194
 First Brodier B'nai B'rith Congregation – Cemetery #2, Post 190
 First Rumanian-American Brotherhood Lodge #13 (AOAS)
 Greidinger Phodoler Unterst. Verein – Cemetery #4, Post 447
 Palestine Lodge – Cemetery #1, Post 71, I.O.S.B.
 Rumanian-American Benevolent Society
 United Wilner Benevolent Association – established on December 24, 1888
 Willner Brother Benevolent Association (also Miskan Bezslel Anshe Wilner)
 Romenar Benevolent Association

Notable burials
 Barney Bernard (1877–1924) – actor
 David Blaustein (1866–1912) – educator, rabbi, and social worker
 Joseph Edelstein (1858–1940) – Yiddish Theater theatrical manager and theater owner and director
 Pauline Edelstein (1866–1942) – Yiddish theatre actress and wife of Joseph Edelstein
 Mark Goldberg (1878–1926) – New York State assemblyman, 1907–1919
 Abraham Goldfaden (1840–1908) – Yiddish playwright, poet, composer, stage director, actor and producer
 Jacob Gordin (1853–1909) – Yiddish playwright
 Louis B. Heller (1905–1993) – U.S. Congressman
 Moses Horowitz (1844–1910) – Yiddish actor and playwright 
 Mike Jacobs (1880–1953) – boxing promoter
 David Kessler (1860–1920) – actor
 Philip Klein (1849–1926) – rabbi
 Alexander Lambert (1863–1929) – pianist and piano teacher
 Sigmund Mogulesko (1858–1914) – Yiddish actor, comedian, singer, director and composer
 John Paley (1871–1907) – Yiddish journalist, writer, newspaper editor
 Regina Prager (1866–1949) – Yiddish Theatre "Prima Donna," actress and opera singer
 Herman Rosenthal (?–1912) – gambler and bookmaker, murdered by gangsters in a conspiracy for complaining to the press about dirty police extorting too much from his illegal gambling business
 Jerry Sterner (1938–2001) – playwright
 Abner Tannenbaum (1848–1913) – Yiddish writer and journalist
 Lilyan Tashman (1899–1934) – actress
 "Big" Jack Zelig (1888–1912), was a Jewish-American New York City gangster and one of the last leaders of the Eastman Gang.
 Eliakum Zunser (1836–1913) – Yiddish poet and songwriter

References

External links

 

Cemeteries in Brooklyn
Jewish cemeteries in New York City
Cemetery vandalism and desecration
1850 establishments in New York (state)